Fading Petals is a 2022 British drama written and directed by Bradley Charlton in his feature directorial debut. The film stars Melanie Revill and Charlotte Reidie. The plot follows a young woman who appears at a sickly older woman's home in order to assist her. Despite their misgivings, the two slowly open up to one another. However, their affinity is short lived when truths are revealed and matters spiral out of control.

The film premiered at the Ultimate Picture Palace in Oxford on 9 March 2022. The film was also released on VOD the same day.

Plot 
Fading Petals sees a young woman (Charlotte Reidie) appear at a sickly older woman's home (Melanie Revill) in order to assist her. After a hostile first encounter and despite their misgivings, the two slowly open up to one another and form an unexpected bond. However, their affinity is short lived when harsh words are spoken and buried memories resurface. Matters then spiral out of control as the older woman struggles to accept the absence of the young woman.

Cast 
 Melanie Revill as The Old Woman
 Charlotte Reidie as The Young Woman
 Tom Metcalf as The Young Man
 Gary Raymond as The Father

Production 
The film was shot in October 2020, during the covid-19 pandemic. The shoot lasted just eleven days, the total production budget was under £10,000 and the crew consisted of only five people.

Release 
The film premiered theatrically in Oxford at the Ultimate Picture Palace on 9 March 2022. It was released on video on demand the same day.

Reception 
Fading Petals received praised for its central performances with Film Threat saying "when Reidie and Revill are on screen together, the film is truly alive" while awarding the film 8/10 stars  and the UK Film Review saying "The atmosphere is downbeat and the dramatic revelations, confrontations and powerful performances make this movie an admirable achievement", awarding the film four stars out of five.

References

External links 
 
 

2020s English-language films
2022 films
2022 drama films
British independent films
2020s British films